The Somalia Cup is the top knockout football tournament in Somalia. Horseed are the competition's most successful club, having won it sixth times.

List of finals

Number of Titles (Known)

References

Association football competitions in Africa